Peter O'Connor may refer to:
Peter O'Connor (athlete) (1872–1957), Irish athlete
Peter O'Connor (psychologist) (born 1942), Australian psychotherapist
Peter O'Connor (Irish republican) (1912–1999), Irish republican and communist who fought in the Spanish civil war

See also
Peter Connor (disambiguation)